Orchards Academy (formerly Swanley Comprehensive School and then Swanley Technology College) is a mixed comprehensive secondary school located in Swanley in South East England.

The school was converted to academy status on 1 November 2010 and was renamed Orchards Academy. It is now part of the Kemnal Academies Trust (a Multi Academy Trust that oversees a number of secondary and primary schools across England). It was previously a foundation school and Technology College administered by Kent County Council. However Orchards Academy continues to coordinate with Kent County Council for admissions.

Orchards Academy offers GCSEs, BTECs and City and Guilds courses as programmes of study for pupils. The school had a sixth form for students aged 16 to 18 which closed in September 2021.

Orchards Academy is managed by a headteacher and senior leadership team with oversight from a board of directors.

Notable former pupils
 Janice Hadlow, former controller BBC 2, author.
 Crispian St. Peters, singer and guitarist.
 Mark Steel, columnist and comedian.
 Mike Stock, songwriter and record producer.
 Ruben Loftus-Cheek, footballer for Chelsea and England.

References

External links
Orchards Academy official website

Secondary schools in Kent
Academies in Kent
Swanley